Marlyse Bernadette Ngo Ndoumbouk (born 3 January 1985) is a Cameroonian footballer who plays as a forward for French club Lille and as a midfielder for the Cameroon women's national team.

International career
Ngo Ndoumbouk played for the senior team of Cameroon at several Africa Women Cup of Nations editions (2006, 2008, 2010, 2018).

International goals
Scores and results list Cameroon's goal tally first

References 

1985 births
Living people
Cameroonian women's footballers
Footballers from Yaoundé
Women's association football forwards
Women's association football midfielders
Cameroon women's international footballers
Frauen-Bundesliga players
FF USV Jena players
Tours FC players
Division 1 Féminine players
AS Nancy Lorraine players
Cameroonian expatriate women's footballers
Cameroonian expatriate sportspeople in the United States
Expatriate women's soccer players in the United States
Cameroonian expatriate sportspeople in Germany
Expatriate women's footballers in Germany
Cameroonian expatriate sportspeople in France
Expatriate women's footballers in France
2019 FIFA Women's World Cup players
21st-century Cameroonian women
20th-century Cameroonian women